Mystery of the Glowing Eye is the fifty-first volume in the Nancy Drew Mystery Stories series. It was first published in 1974 under the pseudonym Carolyn Keene. The actual author was ghostwriter Harriet Stratemeyer Adams.

Plot 
When Ned Nickerson is kidnapped, Nancy knows it has something to do with the code name "Cyclops", but she has to work out the connection with the glowing eye-shaped stone in the museum. The plot involves advanced technology for the 1970s including a robot helicopter and a paralyzing ray.

Nancy is also troubled by a young lawyer's romantic intentions toward Carson Drew.

References

External links
Mystery of the Glowing Eye at Fantastic Fiction

Nancy Drew books
1974 American novels
1974 children's books
Grosset & Dunlap books
Children's mystery novels